Clive Thomas (born 27 June 1936) is a Welsh former football referee, who operated in the English Football League and for FIFA during his career. He came from Treorchy in the Rhondda Valley.

Career
Thomas's original ambition was to be a professional footballer. He achieved a place on the ground staff at Norwich City, playing as an inside forward. However an ankle injury forced him to give up playing. He was then persuaded to take up refereeing at the age of sixteen. He made rapid progress, reaching the Welsh League and in 1964 became a Football League linesman. Two years later aged only thirty he became a Football League referee, one of the youngest referees of the time .

in February 1973, Thomas became the first and only referee to send off the notorious Liverpool hard man Tommy Smith, although this was for speaking out of turn rather than foul play.

Thomas officiated in both the 1974 and 1978 World Cups, and in the 1976 European Championship. During a long and sometimes controversial career as a referee in the old English First Division he was known as "The Book" for his strict interpretation of the laws of the game. His biggest occasion in domestic football came in 1976 when he took charge of the FA Cup final between Southampton and Manchester United, which passed by without incident.

Later that summer, at the European Championships in Yugoslavia, Thomas was the referee of the semi-final between Czechoslovakia and the Netherlands. In the extra time of that match, he missed a rough foul by Antonín Panenka on Johan Cruyff, after which Zdenek Nehoda was able to score the decisive goal. Willem van Hanegem refused to play on after the incident and received a red card. In a 2008 documentary by the Dutch TV program Andere Tijden Sport, Thomas admitted he made a mistake by not noticing the foul. He apologised to Cruyff and to the Dutch national team.

Thomas was involved in another controversy when refereeing the semi-final of the FA Cup in 1977 between local rivals Liverpool and Everton. With the game locked at 2-2 in the closing stages, Thomas disallowed what appeared to be a winning goal from Everton's Bryan Hamilton for handball. Liverpool went on to win the replay. Coincidentally, Thomas had also refereed the replay of a semi-final of the FA Cup in 1975 in which he had disallowed efforts by the same player while playing for Ipswich Town against West Ham United, West Ham winning the tie. 

A year later, at the World Cup in Argentina, he officiated the Round 1 match between Brazil and Sweden, in which he infamously blew the whistle for full time during a play from a corner kick, thus disallowing the late goal Zico scored moments later, which would have given Brazil a 2–1 win. This did not prevent Brazil from progressing in the tournament, although if the goal had been allowed they probably would not have had to encounter the hosts in the second phase.

Thomas refereed the 1981 Football League Cup final between Liverpool and West Ham United and was labelled a "cheat" by West Ham manager John Lyall after allowing a late goal from Alan Kennedy to stand, despite the prone Sammy Lee lying on the grass in an offside position. Thomas declared that Lee was "not interfering with play". This incident occurred just two minutes before the end of extra time and looked likely to give Liverpool a 1-0 win, only for West Ham to equalise with a penalty in the final minute. Thomas also refereed the replay, which Liverpool won 2-1. 

In the same season, he officiated an FA Cup semi-final between Tottenham Hotspur and Wolves and gave a controversial late penalty to Wolves, which was scored by Willie Carr and took the game to a replay. Wolves manager John Barnwell later admitted it was a tactical move as the game neared its end for Wolves players to drive into the box with the ball and fall at the merest touch, in case Thomas was "in one his moods".

Thomas retired as a referee in 1984.

Post-career 

In 1984, he published his autobiography, By the Book.

In 2004, he was elected to the largely ceremonial position of High Sheriff of Mid Glamorgan for 2005. He lives in Porthcawl, Wales.

References

Print
 Clive Thomas (1984) By the Book, Collins Willow,

Internet

1936 births
Welsh football referees
People from Treorchy
Sportspeople from Rhondda Cynon Taf
Living people
1974 FIFA World Cup referees
1978 FIFA World Cup referees
UEFA Euro 1976 referees
High Sheriffs of Glamorgan